Thota Vaikuntam (born 1942) is an Indian painter. His paintings capture simple lifestyle of villagers like the paddy fields, toddy pots on shoulders of men, the household chores, temple rituals etc. His drawings range from stark charcoal on paper, transparent washes and pencil drawings.

Early life and background
Vaikuntam was born in Burugupalli, Karimnagar district, Telangana. His father used to run a grocery shop.

He studied at the College of Fine Arts and Architecture, Hyderabad and Painting and Printmaking, Faculty of Fine Arts, Maharaja Sayajirao University of Baroda  (On a Lalit Kala Akademi Fellowship from Andhra Pradesh). He was under the tutelage of K. G. Subramanyan at Baroda.

The love for women in his paintings can be traced back to his childhood fascination of the impersonations of women characters by the male artists of the theatre groups performing in his village.

Career
Vaikuntam paints colorful and elaborately dressed Telangana region men and seductive women. His muse is the sensuous and voluptuous women of Telangana with their omnipresent vermilion bindis, draped in colourful sarees that highlight their dusky skin.

The stylisation of a painting are a perfect foil to Indian classical dance as the figures seem to dance, as if following their creator in a statuesque movement, reminiscent of temple friezes. He uses the brightest of reds and yellows. The simple women become larger than life as they fill the small format of his paintings draped in bright Sircilla saris.

He worked as art director for the film, Daasi, and received a National award. He also worked on Maa Bhoomi (1979) and Matti Manushulu (1990). A film was made based on his story as Rangula Kala, which displayed the range of his work as young upcoming painter.

Personal life
Vaikuntam is married and has two sons and a daughter.

Awards
 Bharat Bhavan Biennale Award, Bhopal
 National Award,  Govt. of India
 State Award

See also

References

External links
" Thota Vaikuntam " Artworks by Thota Vaikuntam
" Thota Vaikuntam " contemporary indian artist

1942 births
Living people
20th-century Indian painters
Indian male painters
People from Karimnagar district
Maharaja Sayajirao University of Baroda alumni
Painters from Telangana
20th-century Indian male artists